The Fiji Premier League or the FPL, also called Digicel Premier League for sponsorship reasons, is the top division men's professional football league in Fiji. Contested by ten teams, it shares a promotion and relegation system with the Fiji Senior League (FSL). The League is controlled by the Fiji Football Association.

The league was founded as the Fiji National League in 1977 by the Fiji Football Association which was won by Ba. The club that has the most championships is also Ba with 21 titles.

History

Foundation (1977) 
In 1977, the Fiji National League (FNL) was founded. The first ever season was won by Ba.

Sponsorship deals 
Since 2016, the league has been called the Vodafone Premier League after a sponsorship deal with Vodafone Fiji. On March 3, 2021, Digicel Fiji signed a 3 year deal to sponsor the league, effectively renaming the competition to the Digicel Premier League.

Competition format

Competition 
There are 8 clubs in the Fiji Premier League. During the course of a season, each club plays the others twice (a double round-robin system), once at their home stadium and once at that of their opponent's home. Teams receive three points for a win and one point for a draw. No points are awarded for a loss. Teams are ranked by total points, then goal difference, and then goals scored. If still equal, teams are deemed to occupy the same position. If there is a tie for the championship, for relegation, or for qualification to other competitions, a play-off match at a neutral venue decides rank.

Promotion and relegation 
A system of promotion and relegation exists between the Fiji Premier League and the Senior League. The last placed team in the Fiji Premier League are relegated to the Senior League, and the first placed team from the North and South zones of Senior League are promoted to the Fiji Premier League.

Clubs
8 clubs have played in the Fiji Premier League from its inception in 1977, up to and including the 2020 season.

Champions

League Championship (for Districts)

1977: Ba FC
1978: Nadi FC
1979: Ba FC
1980: Nadi FC
1981: Nadi FC
1982: Nadi FC
1983: Ba FC
1984: Nadi FC
1985: Lautoka FC
1986: Ba FC
1987: Ba FC
1988: Lautoka FC
1989: Nadroga F.C.
1990: Nadroga F.C.
1991: Labasa FC
1992: Ba FC
1993: Nadroga F.C.
1994: Ba FC
1995: Ba FC
1996: Suva FC
1997: Suva FC
1998: Nadi FC
1999: Ba FC
2000: Nadi FC
2001: Ba FC
2002: Ba FC
2003: Ba FC
2004: Ba FC
2005: Ba FC
2006: Ba FC
2007: Labasa FC
2008: Ba FC
2009: Lautoka FC
2010: Ba FC
2011: Ba FC
2012: Ba FC
2013: Ba FC
2014: Suva FC
2015: Nadi FC
2016: Ba FC
2017: Lautoka FC
2018: Lautoka FC
2019: Ba FC
2020: Suva FC
2021: Lautoka FC
2022: Rewa FC

Previous winners

National Club Championship
1986: Tanoa SC (Nadi)
1987–88: Not known
1989: Combine Stars SC (Suva) 1–0 Vunika (Labasa)
1990: Not known
1991: Ba FSC
1992: Greenstars 1–0 Ba FSC
1993: Lautoka General
1994–95: Not known
1996: Lautoka General Strikers 
1997: Ba FSC
1998: Raymonds (Rewa) 1–1 Fiji Sugar Corporation (Raymonds on pens)
1999: Kiwi Sports (Labasa) 2–0 KK Nadi Blues
2000: Foodtown Warriors (Lautoka) 1–0 Nadi Eagles
2001–03: Not held
2003–04: Not known
2005: General Machinery (Lautoka) 1–0 Malolo (Nadi)
2006: General Machinery (Lautoka) 1–1 United (Rewa) (aet, 4–1 pen)
2007–08: Kriz Signs Uciwai (Nadi) 2–1 United (Rewa)

Club Franchise League
2005: 4R Electric Ltd (Ba)
2006: Nokia Eagles (Nadi)

Topscorers

References

External links
Fiji – List of Champions, RSSSF.com
Vodafone Premier League - Fiji Sun

 
1
Fiji